Etric Pruitt (born August 16, 1981) is a former American football defensive back. Pruitt played for the Seattle Seahawks in 2005 as a special teams player and third-string safety.  Having never played safety throughout the season as well as the playoffs, he played an important role in Super Bowl XL as Seattle's second string safety Marquand Manuel (filling in for first-string Ken Hamlin, who was out most of the season) was injured in the second quarter. In 2010, Pruitt signed to play with the Southern Indoor Football League team, the Mobile Bay Tarpons.

Healthcare fraud case
Pruitt was charged with one count of conspiracy to commit wire fraud and health care fraud by the United States Department of Justice on December 12, 2019. He pleaded guilty to the charge on January 27, 2020. In October 2021, Pruitt was sentenced to three months in federal prison and 180 days of house arrest.

References

1981 births
Living people
People from Theodore, Alabama
Players of American football from Alabama
American football safeties
Atlanta Falcons players
Detroit Lions players
Seattle Seahawks players
Bloomington Edge players
Southern Miss Golden Eagles football players